Kyle Coffee (born December 23, 1995) is an American soccer player who plays as a forward.

Career

College and amateur 
Coffee played four years of college soccer at the University of Washington between 2015 and 2018, including a redshirted year in 2014. 

Coffee also played with USL Premier Development League side Portland Timbers U23s in 2016, National Premier Soccer League side Detroit City FC in 2017, and with USL Premier Development League side Lane United FC in 2018.

Professional 
On January 11, 2019, Coffee was selected 41st overall in the 2019 MLS SuperDraft by Real Salt Lake. Coffee signed for the club's USL Championship affiliate Real Monarchs on February 27, 2019. His option was declined by Real Monarchs following the 2020 season.

References

External links 
 Real Salt Lake 

1995 births
Living people
American soccer players
Association football forwards
People from Davis County, Utah
Portland Timbers U23s players
Detroit City FC players
Real Monarchs players
Real Salt Lake draft picks
Soccer players from Utah
USL Championship players
USL League Two players
Washington Huskies men's soccer players